Ramnagar (Nepali: रामनगर)  is a rural municipality in Sarlahi District, a part of Province No. 2 in Nepal. It was formed in 2016 occupying current 7 sections (wards) from previous 7 former VDCs. It occupies an area of 26.44 km2 with a total population of 40,128.
Mayor Raja Babu yadav
Deputy mayor Gita devi

References

External links
UN map of the municipalities of Sarlahi  District

Populated places in Sarlahi District
Rural municipalities of Nepal established in 2017
Rural municipalities in Madhesh Province